Rupert Lascelles Pennant-Rea (born 23 January 1948) is a British businessman, journalist, and former Deputy Governor of the Bank of England. He was Editor and later Chairman of The Economist Group.

Early life
The son of Peter Athelwold and Pauline Pennant-Rea, he was educated at the Peterhouse Boys' School, an Anglican church boarding school near Marandellas, Rhodesia (now Marondera, Zimbabwe), before attending Trinity College, Dublin, and Manchester University, where he received his MA degree. He has been married several times, and has three children and one step-daughter.  At one time his wife was Helen Jay, one of the twin daughters of Labour Party politician Douglas Jay.

Career
Pennant-Rea joined the Bank of England in 1973 and remained until 1977, when he left to work for The Economist magazine. He was the magazine's editor from 1986 until 1993. Between 1993 and 1995, he again joined the Bank of England as Deputy Governor of the bank, under the governorship of Edward George; he resigned following reports of an extramarital affair with Mary Ellen Synon, whom he had met at Trinity College, Dublin.

In 1994 he became a member of the influential Washington-based financial advisory body, the Group of Thirty.

In 1995 he became a director of a Canadian mining company, Sherritt International. In March 1996, he was banned from the USA (along with his wife at the time and under-age children) because of Sherritt's commercial interests in Cuba, under the terms of the USA's Helms-Burton Act.

Pennant-Rea was chairman of British company The Stationery Office following its privatisation in 1996. He was a British American Tobacco director from 1998 to 2007. He was also Chairman of Henderson Group and a non-executive director of Go-Ahead Group, a transport company, First Quantum and Gold Fields, both mining companies.

In July 2009, Pennant-Rea was appointed non-executive chairman of The Economist Group, having served as a non-executive director since August 2006.. In July 2018, after nine years, he was succeeded by Paul Deighton. He was Chairman of Royal London, Chairman of PGI, an agriculture company. He was a National Independent director of Times Newspapers. Pennant-Rea recently became Chairman of two start-ups: CloudCycle and Origen Power, both related to greenhouse gases reduction.

In the non-profit sector, Pennant-Rea is a trustee of the Marjorie Deane Foundation, and Chairman of Healing Venezuela. He was a trustee of Speakers Trust, the UK's leading public-speaking training charity and Chairman of the Shakespeare Schools Festival. Pennant-Rea has written a series of books about economics and a novel, Gold Foil.

References

Alumni of Peterhouse Boys' School
Alumni of Trinity College Dublin
Alumni of the University of Manchester
British male journalists
People associated with the Bank of England
The Economist editors
1948 births
Living people
Deputy Governors of the Bank of England